Kee of Hearts is a melodic hard rock band, founded in 2017 by Tommy Heart, singer of Fair Warning, and Kee Marcello, former Europe guitarist. The line-up is completed by Ken Sandlin (Alien) on bass and Marco Di Salvia (Pino Scotto) on drums.

Their first and only album is self-titled and was released on 15 September 2017, produced by Alessandro Del Vecchio, who also played keyboards.

Discography 

 2017 – Kee of Hearts

Line-up 

 Tommy Heart – vocals (2017-now)
 Kee Marcello – guitar (2017-now)
 Ken Sandlin – bass guitar (2017-now)
 Marco Di Salvia – drums (2017-now)

References 

Musical groups established in 2017
Frontiers Records artists
Supergroups (music)
Hard rock musical groups
Musical quartets